Nat Pinkerton in the Fight is a 1920 German film directed by Wolfgang Neff and featuring Béla Lugosi. The film was released in two parts, Das Ende des Artisten Bartolini (1920) and Diebesfallen (1921).

Cast
 Olaf Storm
 Sybill de Brée
 Béla Lugosi – Gang Leader
 Eduard van Meghan
 Joe Nestor-Pridum
 Marian Alma

See also
 Béla Lugosi filmography

References

External links

1920 films
German black-and-white films
Films of the Weimar Republic
German silent feature films